Sowbridge Branch is a  long 2nd order tributary to Primehook Creek in Sussex County, Delaware.

Variant names
According to the Geographic Names Information System, it has also been known historically as:  
Sawbridge Branch
Sow Bridge Branch

Course
Sowbridge Branch rises on the Gravelly Branch divide about 0.5 miles southeast of Ellendale, Delaware.  Sowbridge Branch then flows generally east to meet Primehook Creek at Waples Pond.

Watershed
Sowbridge Branch drains  of area, receives about 45.4 in/year of precipitation, has a topographic wetness index of 649.54 and is about 19% forested.

References

Rivers of Delaware
Rivers of Sussex County, Delaware
Tributaries of Delaware Bay